WHOS (800 AM) is a radio station licensed to serve Decatur, Alabama, United States.  The station is owned by San Antonio-based iHeartMedia and the broadcast license is held by iHM Licenses, LLC. WHOS is one of five stations in the Huntsville, Alabama, market owned by iHeartMedia, Inc. The station is also simulcast on WBHP at 1230 AM in Huntsville, a 106.5 FM broadcast translator in Huntsville, and on WQRV-HD2 (HD Radio).  Its studios are located in Madison, Alabama and its transmitter is located in West Decatur, Alabama.

Programming
WHOS broadcasts a news/talk format that serves northwest Alabama and south-central Tennessee.  The station's current programming is a simulcast of Huntsville, Alabama, sister station WBHP (1230 AM), "The Valley's Big Talker."  The studios for both stations are located in nearby Madison, Alabama.

Notable local weekday programming includes The WBHP Morning Program with Gary Dobbs and Toni Lowery. Notable syndicated weekday programming includes Coast to Coast AM with George Noory, The Glenn Beck Program, The Clay Travis and Buck Sexton Show, and The Sean Hannity Show. Weekend programming includes local news and sports, Somewhere In Time hosted by Art Bell, Fox News Sunday, and select programming from Fox Sports Radio.

History
This station began licensed operation in October 1948 as a 1,000-watt daytime-only station broadcasting at 800 kHz. Originally owned by North Alabama Broadcasting, the station was randomly assigned the WHOS call letters by the Federal Communications Commission; they do not stand for anything in particular. It ran a country music format for most of its first 40 years.

In February 1987, the broadcast license for WHOS was transferred from Dixie Broadcasting, Inc., to Dixie Broadcasting, Inc. as Debtor-In-Possession.  The transfer was approved by the FCC on February 26, 1987. Dixie Broadcasting had filed bankruptcy in an effort to stave off an adverse civil lawsuit outcome regarding the contracted sale of WDRM to W.H. Pollard, Jr., the then-owner of WBHP (1230 AM) in Huntsville, Alabama.

In October 1988, the station, which had been airing a Southern Gospel music format, flipped to an all-Elvis Presley format using the advertising tagline "WHOS alive?". This novel format garnered the station national media attention, but failed to gain a local audience and lasted just six months, in effect a lengthy stunt. After the stunt ended, WHOS switched to a simulcast of then co-owned WDRM and its country music format, which was by this time very successful and on the verge of becoming North Alabama's top-rated station.

In January 1992, a deal was reached for the broadcast license for WHOS to be transferred from Dixie Broadcasting, Inc. as Debtor-In-Possession back to Dixie Broadcasting, Inc.  The deal was approved by the FCC on March 26, 1992, and the transaction was consummated on September 15, 1992.

In December 1991, Dixie Broadcasting, Inc., reached an agreement to merge ownership of this station with the ownership of WBHP to a new company named Mountain Lakes Broadcasting, Inc., pending the resolution of Dixie's legal difficulties.  In October 1993, with Dixie Broadcasting back in good financial standing and the legal issues settled by the appeals courts, the merger moved forward.  The deal was approved by the FCC on November 3, 1993, and the transaction was consummated on November 11, 1993.

In November 1996, J. Mack Bramlett, W.H. Pollard Jr., and Trust B Under The Will Of W.H. Pollard Sr. reached an agreement to transfer control of Mountain Lakes Broadcasting, licensee of this station as well as WDRM and WBHP, to Osborn Communications Corporation.  The deal was approved by the FCC on January 29, 1997. In November 1997, WHOS and WBHP dropped their shared country music format for an all-news format featuring CNN Radio 24 hours a day.

In August 1998, Osborn-owned Mountain Lakes Broadcasting, LLC, reached an agreement to sell this station to AMFM Inc. a subsidiary of Ameron Broadcasting Corporation.  The deal was approved by the FCC on October 2, 1998, and the transaction was consummated on November 5, 1998.

In February 1999, AMFM Inc.'s Ameron Broadcasting Corporation made a deal to sell this station to Clear Channel Communications through its Capstar Royalty II Corporation subsidiary.  The deal was approved by the FCC on March 2, 1999, and the transaction was consummated on March 5, 1999. This deal, a small part of a larger $16.6 billion transaction, included all five of the Huntsville stations then in Clear Channel's Huntsville station group.

Former on-air staff
Notable former WHOS on-air staff included George Rose, who, along with his alter-ego "Cousin Josh" character, hosted "The Cousin Josh Jam-O-Ree" on several North Alabama radio stations in a career that began in 1948 and ended with his death in 2006.

Former programming
WHOS and sister station WBHP were the broadcast flagships for the 1999-2000 final season of the Huntsville Channel Cats and for the short-lived Huntsville Tornado for the 2000-2001 hockey season. Both teams played their home games at the Von Braun Center and competed in the Central Hockey League.

References

External links
 WHOS official website

HOS
News and talk radio stations in the United States
Radio stations established in 1948
Morgan County, Alabama
IHeartMedia radio stations
1948 establishments in Alabama